Zidanta I was a king of the Hittites (Old Kingdom), ruling for 10 years, ca. 1560–1550 BC (middle chronology) or 1496–1486 BC (short chronology timeline). According to the Telepinu Proclamation, this king became a ruler by murder.

Zidanta was married to the daughter of Hantili, brother-in-law to King Mursili I. Zidanta encouraged and helped Hantili to kill Mursili and seize the throne. At the end of Hantili’s life, Zidanta killed Pišeni, the legitimate heir, together with Pišeni’s children and foremost servants, and so made it possible for himself to become king.

It is known that his wife’s name ends with either -ša or -ta.

Zidanta was killed by his own son, Ammuna, who then succeeded him.

Notes

External links
Reign of Zidanta I

Hittite kings
15th-century BC rulers